Fredrik Larsson (born 13 August 1968) is a Swedish professional golfer.

Larsson played on the Challenge Tour 1990–2000 where he enjoyed success, winning four times 1991–1993, putting him on the list of golfers with most Challenge Tour wins. He was also runner-up at the 1998 NCC Open, 1998 Volvo Finnish Open, 1996 Telia InfoMedia Grand Prix, 1993 SIAB Open and the 1992 Milano Open.

Larsson played on the European Tour in 1994 where his best result was a tie for 19th at the Johnnie Walker Classic in Thailand.

Professional wins (4)

Challenge Tour wins (3)

Other wins (1)
1993 Open de Mont Griffon

See also
List of golfers with most Challenge Tour wins

References

External links

Swedish male golfers
European Tour golfers
Sportspeople from Umeå
1968 births
Living people